Mateusz Szwoch (born 19 March 1993) is a Polish professional footballer who plays as a midfielder for Polish club Wisła Płock.

Club career

Honours
Arka Gdynia
 Polish Cup: 2016–17

Legia Warsaw
 Ekstraklasa: 2017–18

External links

References

Living people
1993 births
People from Starogard Gdański
Sportspeople from Pomeranian Voivodeship
Polish footballers
Association football midfielders
Poland youth international footballers
Arka Gdynia players
Legia Warsaw players
Legia Warsaw II players
Wisła Płock players
Gedania 1922 Gdańsk players
Ekstraklasa players
I liga players
III liga players